Nd:YAG (neodymium-doped yttrium aluminum garnet; Nd:Y3Al5O12) is a crystal that is used as a lasing medium for solid-state lasers. The dopant, triply ionized neodymium, Nd(III),  typically replaces a small fraction (1%) of the yttrium ions in the host crystal structure of the yttrium aluminum garnet (YAG), since the two ions are of similar size. It is the neodymium ion which provides the lasing activity in the crystal, in the same fashion as red chromium ion in ruby lasers.

Laser operation of Nd:YAG was first demonstrated by J.E. Geusic et al. at Bell Laboratories in 1964.

Technology

Nd:YAG lasers are optically pumped using a flashtube or laser diodes. These are one of the most common types of laser, and are used for many different applications.
Nd:YAG lasers typically emit light with a wavelength of 1064 nm, in the infrared. However, there are also transitions near 946, 1120, 1320, and 1440 nm.  Nd:YAG lasers operate in both pulsed and continuous mode. Pulsed Nd:YAG lasers are typically operated in the so-called Q-switching mode: An optical switch is inserted in the laser cavity waiting for a maximum population inversion in the neodymium ions before it opens. Then the light wave can run through the cavity, depopulating the excited laser medium at maximum population inversion. In this Q-switched mode, output powers of 250 megawatts and pulse durations of 10 to 25 nanoseconds have been achieved. The high-intensity pulses may be efficiently frequency doubled to generate laser light at 532 nm, or higher harmonics at 355, 266 and 213 nm.

Nd:YAG absorbs mostly in the bands between 730–760 nm and 790–820 nm. At low current densities krypton flashlamps have higher output in those bands than do the more common xenon lamps, which produce more light at around 900 nm. The former are therefore more efficient for pumping Nd:YAG lasers.

The amount of the neodymium dopant in the material varies according to its use. For continuous wave output, the doping is significantly lower than for pulsed lasers. The lightly doped CW rods can be optically distinguished by being less colored, almost white, while higher-doped rods are pink-purplish.

Other common host materials for neodymium are: YLF (yttrium lithium fluoride, 1047 and 1053 nm), YVO4 (yttrium orthovanadate, 1064 nm), and glass. A particular host material is chosen in order to obtain a desired combination of optical, mechanical, and thermal properties. Nd:YAG lasers and variants are pumped either by flashtubes, continuous gas discharge lamps, or near-infrared laser diodes (DPSS lasers). Prestabilized laser (PSL) types of Nd:YAG lasers have proved to be particularly useful in providing the main beams for gravitational wave interferometers such as LIGO, VIRGO, GEO600 and TAMA.

Applications

Medicine

Nd:YAG lasers are used in ophthalmology to correct posterior capsular opacification, after cataract surgery, for peripheral iridotomy in patients with chronic and acute angle-closure glaucoma, where it has largely superseded surgical iridectomy, for the treatment of vitreous eye floaters, for pan-retinal photocoagulation in the treatment of proliferative diabetic retinopathy, and to damage the retina in ophthalmology animal research.

Nd:YAG lasers emitting light at 1064 nm have been the most widely used laser for laser-induced thermotherapy, in which benign or malignant lesions in various organs are ablated by the beam.

In oncology, Nd:YAG lasers can be used to remove skin cancers. They are also used to reduce benign thyroid nodules, and to destroy primary and secondary malignant liver lesions.

To treat benign prostatic hyperplasia (BPH), Nd:YAG lasers can be used for laser prostate surgery—a form of transurethral resection of the prostate.

These lasers are also used extensively in the field of cosmetic medicine for laser hair removal and the treatment of minor vascular defects such as spider veins on the face and legs. Nd:YAG lasers are also used to treat venous lake lip lesions. Recently Nd:YAG lasers have been used for treating dissecting cellulitis of the scalp, a rare skin disease.

Using hysteroscopy the Nd:YAG laser has been used for removal of uterine septa within the inside of the uterus.

In podiatry, the Nd:YAG laser is being used to treat onychomycosis, which is fungus infection of the toenail. The merits of laser treatment of these infections are not yet clear, and research is being done to establish effectiveness.

Dentistry
Nd:YAG dental lasers have been used for the removal of dental caries as an alternative to drill therapy, although evidence supporting its use is of low quality. They have also been used for soft tissue surgeries in the oral cavity, such as gingivectomy, periodontal sulcular debridement, LANAP, and pulpotomy. Nd:YAG dental lasers have also been shown to be effective at treating and preventing dental hypersensitivity, as an adjunct for periodontal instrumentation, and for the treatment of recurrent aphthous stomatitis.

Manufacturing
Nd:YAG lasers are used in manufacturing for engraving, etching, or marking a variety of metals and plastics, or for metal surface enhancement processes like laser peening. They are extensively used in manufacturing for cutting and welding steel, semiconductors and various alloys. For automotive applications (cutting and welding steel) the power levels are typically 1–5 kW.  Super alloy drilling (for gas turbine parts) typically uses pulsed Nd:YAG lasers (millisecond pulses, not Q-switched). Nd:YAG lasers are also employed to make subsurface markings in transparent materials such as glass or acrylic glass.  Lasers of up to 2 kW are used for selective laser melting of metals in additive layered manufacturing. In aerospace applications, they can be used to drill cooling holes for enhanced air flow/heat exhaust efficiency.

Nd:YAG lasers are also used in the non-conventional rapid prototyping process laser engineered net shaping (LENS).

Laser peening typically uses a high energy (10 to 40 joule) 10 to 30 nanosecond pulse. The laser beam is focused down to a few millimeters in diameter to deposit gigawatts of power on the surface of a part. Laser peening is unlike other manufacturing processes in that it neither heats or adds material; it is a mechanical process of cold working the metallic component to impart compressive residual stresses. Laser peening is widely used in gas-fired turbine engines in both aerospace and power generation to increase strength and improve resistance to damage and metal fatigue.

Fluid dynamics

Nd:YAG lasers can be used for flow visualization techniques in fluid dynamics (for example particle image velocimetry or laser-induced fluorescence).

Biophysics

Nd:YAG lasers are frequently used to build optical tweezers for biological applications. This is because Nd:YAG lasers mostly emit at a wavelength of 1064 nm. Biological samples have a low absorption coefficient at this wavelength, as biological samples are usually mostly made up of water.
 As such, using an Nd:YAG laser minimizes the damage to the biological sample being studied.

Automotive
Researchers from Japan's National Institutes of Natural Sciences are developing laser igniters that use YAG chips to ignite fuel in an engine, in place of a spark plug. The lasers use several 800 picosecond long pulses to ignite the fuel, producing faster and more uniform ignition. The researchers say that such igniters could yield better performance and fuel economy, with fewer harmful emissions.

Military

The Nd:YAG laser is the most common laser used in laser designators and laser rangefinders.

During the Iran–Iraq War, Iranian soldiers suffered more than 4000 cases of laser eye injury, caused by a variety of Iraqi sources including tank rangefinders. The 1064 nm wavelength of Nd:YAG is thought to be particularly dangerous, as it is invisible and initial exposure is painless.

The Chinese ZM-87 blinding laser weapon uses a laser of this type, though only 22 have been produced due to their prohibition by the Convention on Certain Conventional Weapons. North Korea is reported to have used one of these weapons against American helicopters in 2003.

Cavity ring-down spectroscopy (CRDS)
The Nd:YAG may be used in the application of cavity ring-down spectroscopy, which is used to measure the concentration of some light-absorbing substance.

Laser-induced breakdown spectroscopy (LIBS)

A range of Nd:YAG lasers are used in analysis of elements in the periodic table. Though the application by itself is fairly new with respect to conventional methods such as XRF or ICP, it has proven to be less time consuming and a cheaper option to test element concentrations. A high-power Nd:YAG laser is focused onto the sample surface to produce plasma. Light from the plasma is captured by spectrometers and the characteristic spectra of each element can be identified, allowing concentrations of elements in the sample to be measured.

Laser pumping

Nd:YAG lasers, mainly via their second and third harmonics, are widely used to excite dye lasers either in the liquid or solid state.  They are also used as pump sources for vibronically broadened solid-state lasers such as Cr4+:YAG or via the second harmonic for pumping Ti:sapphire lasers.

Additional frequencies
For many applications, the infrared light is frequency-doubled or -tripled using nonlinear optical materials such as lithium triborate to obtain visible (532 nm, green) or ultraviolet light. Cesium lithium borate generates the 4th and 5th harmonics of the Nd:YAG 1064 nm fundamental wavelength. A green laser pointer is a frequency doubled Nd:YVO4 diode-pumped solid state laser (DPSS laser). Nd:YAG can be also made to lase at its non-principal wavelength. The line at 946 nm is typically employed in "blue laser pointer" DPSS lasers, where it is doubled to 473 nm.

Physical and chemical properties of Nd:YAG

Properties of YAG crystal
 Formula: Y3Al5O12
 Molecular weight: 596.7
 Crystal structure: Cubic 
 Hardness: 8–8.5 (Mohs)
 Melting point: 1970 °C (3540 °F)
 Density: 4.55 g/cm3

Refractive index of Nd:YAG

Properties of Nd:YAG @ 25 °C (with 1% Nd doping)
 Formula: Y2.97Nd0.03Al5O12
 Weight of Nd: 0.725%
 Atoms of Nd per unit volume: 1.38×1020 /cm3
 Charge state of Nd: 3+
 Emission wavelength: 1064 nm
 Transition: 4F3/2 → 4I11/2
 Duration of fluorescence: 230 μs
 Thermal conductivity: 0.14 W·cm−1·K−1
 Specific heat capacity: 0.59 J·g−1·K−1
 Thermal expansion: 6.9×10−6 K−1
 dn/dT: 7.3×10−6 K−1
 Young's modulus: 3.17×104 K·g/mm−2
 Poisson's ratio: 0.25
 Resistance to thermal shock: 790 W·m−1

References and notes

 
 

Solid-state lasers
Dental lasers
Ophthalmology
Laser medicine
Medical equipment
Neodymium compounds
Yttrium compounds
Aluminium compounds